The Martyrdom of Philip Strong is a 1916 American drama silent film directed by Richard Ridgely and written by Everett McNeil, Francis Neilson and Charles Sheldon. The film stars Robert Conness, Mabel Trunnelle, Janet Dawley, Bigelow Cooper, Helen Strickland and Frank A. Lyons. The film was released on November 3, 1916, by Paramount Pictures.

Plot

Cast 
Robert Conness as Philip Strong
Mabel Trunnelle as Sarah Strong
Janet Dawley as Irma Strong
Bigelow Cooper as Brother Man
Helen Strickland as Mrs. Alden
Frank A. Lyons as William Winter 
William Wadsworth as Dunn
Herbert Prior as Hikes
Olive Wright as May Hikes
Edith Wright as Loreen
Brad Sutton as Hooks

References

External links 
 

1916 films
1910s English-language films
Silent American drama films
1916 drama films
Paramount Pictures films
American black-and-white films
Films directed by Richard Ridgely
American silent feature films
1910s American films